The Bosphorus Cross-Continental Swim is an annual open water swimming event between the continents Europe and Asia held annually at Bosphorus, Istanbul, Turkey. Established in 1989, the event is organized by the Turkish Olympic Committee and sponsored by Samsung.

History
The event was held for the first time on July 23, 1989 and 64 men and 4 women took part. In 1992, the event became international with the participation of 22 swimmers from Czechoslovakia and two from the United States. The course record was set in 2006 by Turkish swimmers Alişan Alaşlı in the men's category with 39:07.11 and Beren Kayrak in the women's category with 40:50.35. Since 2010, every swimmer completing the course receives a certificate titled "Intercontinental Swimmer".

Notable swimmers
Many notable swimmers from all over the world have entered the event during its history. In 2012, American swimmer Mark Spitz, nine-time Olympic champion, and former world record-holder in seven events, was a guest, and performed shows. In 2013, Australian Olympic gold medalist swimmer Ian Thorpe was also a competitor.

Turkish woman Fatma Nazan Göğen has taken part every year since its beginning in 1989. Turkish Levent Aksüt has been the oldest swimmer so far at the age of 85. Local sportsman Hasan Eskioğlu holds the record for the most victories at ten times, of which seven were in a row.

Participation
More than 2,000 swimmers, including over 500 females with half of them being foreigners, from over 50 countries participate at the event. As of 2019, the number of foreign swimmers is limited to 1,200, and only up to 350 are permitted to participate from each country. Rising popularity of the race, especially in Russia and Ukraine, led to a huge rush for slots, with whole international quota being filled in less than an hour after the start of registration in January. There are 12 age categories for each gender, from the age of 14 to 70 and over.

Course
The route starts at the Pier of Kanlıca, north of the Fatih Sultan Mehmet Bridge, in the Asian part of Istanbul, runs southwards, and finishes at Cemil Topuzlu Park in Kuruçeşme, north of the Bosphorus Bridge, in the European part of the city. Hence, the participants swim downstream along the dominant surface current of the Bosphorus. The swimmers are advised to stay in the middle of the strait, to avoid reverse currents that often form in coves along the shores, using coastal landmarks for navigation, and turning to European shore only after passing Galatasaray Islet. Those who miss the finish and are carried by the current below the Bosphorus bridge are disqualified and must enter lifeguards’ boats. Days before the race, introductory boat tours along the route are offered to the contestants, with instruction in Turkish, English and Russian.

Gallery

References

External links
 Bosphorus Cross-Continental Swimming Race at Turkish Olympic Committee 

Swimming competitions in Turkey
Open water swimming competitions
1989 establishments in Turkey
Annual sporting events in Turkey
Recurring sporting events established in 1989
Sport in Istanbul
Bosphorus
Beykoz
Beşiktaş